Dil Bechara Pyar Ka Maara is a Hindi film released in 2004, directed and written by Onkar Nath 
Mishra and starring Vikas Kalantri, Aslam Khan, Aman Sondhi, Divya Palat, Jonita Doda, Rajpal Yadav and Mallika Kapoor.

Cast
 Vikas Kalantri
 Aslam Khan
 Aman Sondhi
 Divya Palat
 Jonita Doda
 Rajpal Yadav
 Mallika Kapoor
 Shehzad Khan

Soundtrack

External links
IndiaFM.com, review and miscellaneous info
 

2000s Hindi-language films
2004 films
Films scored by Nikhil-Vinay